The Amsterdam Free Library, located at 28 Church Street in Amsterdam, Montgomery County, New York was built from 1902 to 1903 and was designed by Albert W. Fuller in the Beaux-Arts style.  It is a Carnegie library, the building of which was funded by philanthropist Andrew Carnegie, who contributed $25,000.

The library was added to the National Register of Historic Places in 2019.

References

External links

Beaux-Arts architecture in New York (state)
Buildings and structures in Montgomery County, New York
1903 establishments in New York (state)
National Register of Historic Places in Montgomery County, New York
Carnegie libraries in New York (state)